TrueBlue is the frequent-flyer program of JetBlue that offers points to passengers traveling on most fare types, as well as to consumers who utilize JetBlue co-branded credit cards.

History 
In 2008, JetBlue launched TrueBlue, its very own loyalty program. Under the original TrueBlue program, flights were worth two, four, or six points based on distance of the flights, and double points were awarded for flights booked online.

In September 2009, JetBlue made changes to its TrueBlue program. In the new program, members receive three points for every dollar spent toward a flight, excluding taxes and fees, plus an additional three points for every dollar spent on a flight if booked online directly on the JetBlue.com website. Additional points are awarded if the member uses the Barclay's issued JetBlue Mastercard credit card to purchase the flight. The price of flights in points depend on the fare of the flight in U.S. dollars. 

The new program launched on November 9, 2009.

In June 2013, JetBlue announced that TrueBlue points will never expire for any reason.

Partnership 
JetBlue rewards program offers partnerships with the following companies with partnerships to accumulate points.

 Amazon
 Avis Budget Group
 InterContinental Hotels Group
 jetOpinions
 Marriott Bonvoy

Airlines 
The following airlines partner with jetBlue TrueBlue to allow their customers to accumulate points from their airlines.

 Emirates
 Hawaiian Airlines
 Icelandair
 JSX
 Silver Airways
 Singapore Airlines
 South African Airways

Mosaic 
TrueBlue Mosaic is a top tier Loyalty Program within TrueBlue Operations. To have Mosaic Status, customers have to meet either two measures: they need either 15,000 points or 30 flight segments and 12,000 points, all within a calendar year.

The benefits include being among the first to board, first and second checked bags free, and a dedicated customer service line.

Reference List 

JetBlue
Frequent flyer programs
